Red Peak is an 11,699-foot-elevation (3,566 meter) mountain summit located in the Sierra Nevada mountain range, in Madera County of northern California, United States. Red Peak is the second-highest peak in the Clark Range, which is a subset of the Sierra Nevada. This geographical feature's brilliant color is caused by iron-bearing minerals weathered to an iron rust which colors the granite.

History
The peak's name originated as "Red Mountain" as it was called by the Whitney Survey. The Red Peak name was officially adopted in 1932 by the U.S. Board on Geographic Names. The California Geological Survey had climbed this peak by 1870, and in 1920 Ansel Adams placed a Sierra Club cylinder-type register at the summit.

Climate
According to the Köppen climate classification system, Red Peak is located in an alpine climate zone. Most weather fronts originate in the Pacific Ocean, and travel east toward the Sierra Nevada mountains. As fronts approach, they are forced upward by the peaks, causing them to drop their moisture in the form of rain or snowfall onto the range (orographic lift). Precipitation runoff from this mountain drains into tributaries of the Merced River.

See also

 List of mountain peaks of California

Gallery

References

External links
 Weather forecast: Red Peak
Mountains of Madera County, California
Mountains of Yosemite National Park
North American 3000 m summits
Mountains of Northern California
Sierra Nevada (United States)
Landforms of Yosemite National Park